Boxing at the 2007 Southeast Asian Games were held in the Gymnasium in Municipality of Tambon Mueang Pak, Amphoe Pak Thong Chai, Nakhon Ratchasima Province, Thailand. The boxing schedule began on December 7 to December 13.

Medal tally

Medalists

Men

Women

External links
Southesast Asian Games Official Results

 
2007 Southeast Asian Games events
Boxing at the Southeast Asian Games
2007 in boxing
International boxing competitions hosted by Thailand